Joel Edwards is an English record producer, singer, songwriter and remixer; he had top ten success with his band Deepest Blue. He also works under the names Deeper The Fall, London Fields, TrAmHeD, Jupiter Snakes and Dead Guys. In 2008 to 2009 Joel toured as lead singer for the Italian band Planet Funk.

Discography

Solo album
Lost And Found (2006)

Deepest Blue
See Deepest Blue#Discography.

Participations

 Namdam is composed of Joel Edwards and Anthony Mein.
 Saviour, Zoom and Deepest Blue are composed of Joel Edwards and Matt Schwartz.

Remixes

External links

Year of birth missing (living people)
Living people
English record producers
English male singers
English songwriters
Remixers
British male songwriters